Sergiy Lagkuti (born 24 April 1985) is a Ukrainian former racing cyclist. He rode at the 2014 UCI Road World Championships.

Major results

2008
 3rd  Team pursuit, 2008–09 UCI Track Cycling World Cup Classics, Melbourne
2009
 1st Stage 6 Tour of Bulgaria
 2009–10 UCI Track Cycling World Cup Classics
3rd  Scratch, Manchester
3rd  Madison, Melbourne
2010
 1st Stage 5 Bałtyk–Karkonosze Tour
 3rd  Madison, UEC European Track Championships
2012
 1st Stage 4 Tour of Bulgaria
 3rd  Points race, UEC European Track Championships
 3rd Time trial, National Road Championships
 4th Overall Dookoła Mazowsza
 10th Race Horizon Park
2013
 2nd  Madison, 2012–13 UCI Track Cycling World Cup, Aguascalientes
 4th Time trial, National Road Championships
2014
 1st Stage 8 Tour of Qinghai Lake
 4th Race Horizon Park 2
 5th Time trial, National Road Championships
 5th Overall Tour d'Azerbaïdjan
 10th Overall Grand Prix of Adygeya
 10th Race Horizon Park 3
2015
 1st  Time trial, National Road Championships
 1st Moscow Cup
 1st Race Horizon Park for Peace
 4th Grand Prix of Vinnytsia
 5th Grand Prix of ISD
 7th Overall Five Rings of Moscow
2016
 1st  Overall Tour of Ukraine
1st Stages 1 & 2a (TTT)
 1st  Overall Tour of Qinghai Lake
1st Stage 6
 3rd Tour de Ribas
 6th Belgrade–Banja Luka I
2017
 1st  Overall Tour of Bulgaria North
1st  Mountains classification
1st Stage 1
 1st Tour de Ribas
 3rd Overall Tour of Ukraine
1st Stage 2 (TTT)
 3rd Race Horizon Park Classic
 5th Time trial, National Road Championships
 5th Odessa Grand Prix
 6th Overall Tour of Bulgaria South
 8th Overall Tour of Qinghai Lake

References

External links

1985 births
Living people
Ukrainian male cyclists
Sportspeople from Simferopol